Empire Community Park is a community park in Empire, Stanislaus County, California. 
It includes the Empire Community Pool and the Empire City (Historic Landmark) memorial.

References

Municipal parks in California
Parks in Stanislaus County, California